In computer science, a double-sided disk is a disk of which both sides are used to store data.

Early floppy disks only used one surface for recording.  The term single-sided disk was not common until the introduction of the double-sided disk, which offered double the capacity in the same physical size. Initially, double-sided disks had to be removed and flipped over to access data on the other side, but eventually devices were made that could read both sides without the need to eject the disk.

Manufacturers sold both single-sided and double-sided disks with the double-sided disks being typically 50% more expensive than single-sided disks. While the magnetic-coated medium was coated on both sides, the single-sided floppies had a read-write notch on only one side, thus allowing only one side of the disk to be used. When users discovered this, they began buying the less-expensive single-sided disks and "notching" them using scissors, a hole punch, or a specially-designed "notcher" to allow them to write to the reverse side of the disk.

DVDs also are available in single-sided and double-sided formats, often as an alternative to two-disc packages. Both sides can be either single layered (DVD-10) or dual layered (DVD-18) or both (DVD-14). When used for movie releases, double-sided DVDs typically have the widescreen (or letterboxed) version of the movie on one side, and the pan and scan (sometimes called "fullscreen") version on the other side. Other releases place the feature on Side A, and the extra features on the Side B. Longer films would be divided between the two sides, starting on Side A and continuing on Side B, and include a prompt for when to flip the disc (identically to a LaserDisc). It is more convenient (and cheaper) for movies to be released on single-sided discs, with the film and extras on the same side, and widescreen and letterbox versions packaged separately. Indeed, a few DVD titles that were initially issued as double-sided discs were later reissued as two single-sided disc sets. 

DualDisc and DVDplus are two variants on the double-sided DVD format where one side is a compact disc. Both formats were created as potential successors to the compact disc format; in particular, the ability to include both audio and video features on the DVD side was intended to boost album sales by providing consumers with an added incentive to purchase physical albums instead of downloading pirated MP3s. However, both disc formats failed to make any long-lasting commercial impact and faded into obscurity by the end of the 2000s, due to competition from digital downloads and the Super Audio CD and DVD-Audio formats and because of physical design flaws that impeded DualDiscs and DVDplus discs' compatibility with many commercial CD players. Specifically, the CD side of a DualDisc was much thinner than a standard CD (whereas the DVD side was thick enough to meet standardized specifications), offsetting it from the focal length of CD players' infrared lasers, while DVDplus discs were much thicker than both standard CDs and standard DVDs, causing the discs to have difficulties fitting into slot-loading players and disc changers.

See also 
 Floppy disk format - explanation of single-sided double-density

Rotating disc computer storage media